Haris Mohammed Hassan (born 3 March 1958) is an Iraqi football midfielder who played for Iraq in the 1986 FIFA World Cup. He also played for Al-Rasheed Club.

Haris Mohammed was a skilful and creative right sided attacking midfielder,  born and bred in Mosul. He started to hone his skills on the streets, frequently annoying the neighbours. After realising his potential on the football field, he played for the school province football team under the supervision of coach Dawud Azzawi.

He earned reputation as a goalscorer with the Iraqi youth team winning the 1978 Asian Youth Championship in Bangladesh, he joined Talaba SC, helping them to two league titles while at the club. He had the most success while at Al-Rasheed, winning three leagues, two cups and a record three Arab Club Championships. In 1987, in the Arab Club Championship held in Saudi Arabia, Haris was top scorer with 7 goals helping the club to a record 3rd title.

Haris was part of the Iraqi team that won the 1982 Asian Games and he also played for Iraq in the 1984 Olympics and the 1986 World Cup. He returned to Mosul in 1991, where he later retired.

He currently works as a pundit for beIN Sports.

Career statistics

International goals
Scores and results list Iraq's goal tally first.

References

External links
 FIFA profile

1958 births
Iraqi footballers
Iraq international footballers
Association football midfielders
Al-Karkh SC players
Al-Rasheed players
1986 FIFA World Cup players
Living people
Asian Games medalists in football
Footballers at the 1982 Asian Games
Footballers at the 1986 Asian Games
Asian Games gold medalists for Iraq
Medalists at the 1982 Asian Games